The Opel Agila (from Lat. agilis, "agile") is a city car marketed under the German marque Opel from 2000 to 2014, as a rebadged variant of the Suzuki Wagon R+ (first generation) and the Suzuki Splash (second generation). It has been marketed under the Vauxhall marque in the United Kingdom.

Its first generation was classified as a city car, whereas the second generation is a mini MPV, and the car was replaced in March 2015 by the Opel Karl, which is known as the Vauxhall Viva in the United Kingdom.

First generation (H00; 2000)

The first generation Agila was a rebadged version of the Suzuki Wagon R-Wide, which was produced in Japan originally. The Agila's Opel sourced 1.0 and 1.2 litre petrol engines were smaller than the 1.3 litre found in the European market Wagon R+. The cam-chain Opel engines, as used in the Corsa, proved less reliable than the cambelt driven Suzuki unit. Sales began in August 2000.

The 1.0 engine was the Z10XE engine with three cylinders in line and 973 cc. The 1.2 engine was the Z12XE with four cylinders in line and 1199 cc. The Agila was built at Opel's factory in Gliwice, Poland. The Suzuki Wagon R+ for the European market was built at the Magyar Suzuki plant in Esztergom, Hungary. The facelift was launched in August 2003. This was also when the 1.25-liter diesel option was introduced. The petrol engines were also updated and now featured Opel's TwinPort technology as well as marginal displacement increases, although the updated 1.2-liter four-cylinder option did not arrive until January 2004.

Second generation (H08; 2007)

The second generation Agila was officially announced on 15 May 2007, and was presented at the 2007 Frankfurt Motor Show, as a rebadged variant of the Suzuki Splash.

The car was  longer than its predecessor — similar to superminis and mini MPVs such as the Citroën C3 Picasso, Toyota Yaris, Honda Jazz and Nissan Micra. It was slightly larger in size than the previous generation, and was classified as a mini MPV. Sales began in April 2008.

Petrol engines were a three cylinder 1.0 litre,  and a four cylinder 1.2 litre , and the diesel unit a four cylinder 1.3 litre CDTi  with common rail technology. The Agila came in two different trim levels: Base/Essentia and Edition/Enjoy.

European production of the Opel Agila and Suzuki Splash took place at the Magyar Suzuki plant in Esztergom, Hungary. The car was replaced in March 2015 by the Opel Karl, known as the Vauxhall Viva in the United Kingdom.

Engines
All engines contain the 'Ecotec' technology.

References

External links

Vauxhall Agila page

Agila
OEM Suzuki vehicles
City cars
Mini MPVs
Front-wheel-drive vehicles
Hatchbacks
2010s cars
Cars introduced in 2000
Cars discontinued in 2014
Euro NCAP superminis